The 1973 Viceroy Classic – Doubles was an event of the 1973 Viceroy Classic men's tennis tournament that was played Hong Kong from 29 October until 4 November 1973. The draw consisted of 12 teams. Colin Dibley  and Rod Laver won the doubles title, defeating Paul Gerken and Brian Gottfried in the final, 6–3, 5–7, 17–15.

Draw

References

External links
 ITF tournament edition details

Viceroy Classic
1973 in Hong Kong
Tennis in Hong Kong